Acacia terminalis (sunshine wattle) is a shrub or small tree to 6 m in height. It is an Australian native whose range extends through New South Wales, Victoria and Tasmania.

Four subspecies have been recognised, although there are additional hybrids, especially around Sydney:
 A. terminalis subsp. angustifolia
 A. terminalis subsp. aurea
 A. terminalis subsp. longiaxialis
 A. terminalis subsp. terminalis: listed as an Endangered Species under the Commonwealth Environment Protection and Biodiversity Conservation Act 1999. It is rare and confined to the Eastern Suburbs of Sydney, between Cronulla and Manly. It differs from the other forms of the species in being hairier, and having thicker peduncles and wider seed pods.

Image Gallery

References

External links
 NSW Flora Online
 NSW threatened species
Google Images: Acacia terminalis.
 The Australasian Virtual Herbarium – Occurrence data for Acacia terminalis.

terminalis
Fabales of Australia
Flora of New South Wales
Flora of Tasmania
Flora of Victoria (Australia)